Metal pair may refer to:
Bimetallic strip
Thermocouple